A routing number is a form of bank code.

Routing number may refer to:
 ABA routing transit number, a bank code used in the United States
 Routing number (Canada)